Staats House may refer to:
Joachim Staats House and Gerrit Staats Ruin, built , listed on the NRHP in Rensselaer County, New York
Staats House (South Bound Brook, New Jersey), Abraham Staats House, built , listed on the NRHP in Somerset County, New Jersey
Staats House (Stockport, New York), Abram Staats House, also Abraham Staats House, built , in Columbia County, New York